Gateshead Harriers & AC is an athletics club based at Gateshead International Stadium, Gateshead, England, UK.

History
Gateshead Harriers was founded in 1904 as Gateshead St. Mary's Church Running Club. Originally for men only, ladies were permitted to join from 1951 onwards. The club moved to its present site at Gateshead International Stadium in 1956. Today Gateshead Harriers & AC cater for all athletes from ages 8+ to veterans in all track, field, road and cross country disciplines through winter and summer.

Notable Athletes
Brendan Foster C.B.E- Achieved fame in the 10,000m and the 5000m
Jonathan Edwards C.B.E -Achieved fame in the triple jump
Richard Kilty -Well known for 60m, 100m and 200m
Colin Walker - Known for 3000m steeplechase

Training
Historically Gateshead Harriers & AC have trained on Tuesdays and Thursdays. This allows for competition to be commonly held on Sundays. Some athletes and training groups do however train on other days.

Sport in Gateshead
Athletics clubs in England
Sports organizations established in 1904
1904 establishments in England